Sieve theory is a set of general techniques in number theory, designed to count, or more realistically to estimate the size of, sifted sets of integers. The prototypical example of a sifted set is the set of prime numbers up to some prescribed limit X.  Correspondingly, the prototypical example of a sieve is the sieve of Eratosthenes, or the more general Legendre sieve. The direct attack on prime numbers using these methods soon reaches apparently insuperable obstacles, in the way of the accumulation of error terms. In one of the major strands of number theory in the twentieth century, ways were found of avoiding some of the difficulties of a frontal attack with a naive idea of what sieving should be.

One successful approach is to approximate a specific sifted set of numbers (e.g. the set of
prime numbers) by another, simpler set (e.g. the set of almost prime numbers), which is typically somewhat larger than the original set, and easier to analyze. More sophisticated sieves also do not work directly with sets per se, but instead count them according to carefully chosen weight functions on these sets (options for giving some elements of these sets more "weight" than others). Furthermore, in some modern applications, sieves are used not to estimate the size of a sifted
set, but to produce a function that is large on the set and mostly small outside it, while being easier to analyze than
the characteristic function of the set.

Basic sieve theory 
For information on notation see at the end.

We start with some finite sequence of non-negative numbers . In the most basic case this sequence is just the indicator function  of some set  we want to sieve. However this abstraction allows for more general situations.

The goal of sieve theory is to estimate the sifting function

Legendre's identity 
We can rewrite the sifting function with Legendre's identity

by using the Möbius function and some functions  induced by the elements of

Example 
The Möbius function is negative for every prime, so we get

Approximation of the congruence sum 
One assumes then that  can be written as

where  is a density, meaning a multiplicative function such that

The sifting function becomes

or in short

The partial sum of the sifting function alternately over- and undercounts, so the remainder term will be huge. Brun's idea to improve this was to replace  in the sifting function with a weight sequence  consisting of restricted Möbius functions.

Since  is multiplicative, one can also work with the identity

Notation: a word of caution regarding the notation, in the literature one often identifies the set of sequences  with the set  itself. This means one writes  to define a sequence . Also in the literature the sum  is sometimes notated as the cardinality  of some set , while we have defined  to be already the cardinality of this set. We used 

Types of sieving 

Modern sieves include the Brun sieve, the Selberg sieve, the Turán sieve, the large sieve, and the larger sieve. One of the original purposes of sieve theory was to try to prove conjectures in number theory such as the twin prime conjecture.  While the original broad aims of sieve theory still are largely unachieved, there have been some partial successes, especially in combination with other number theoretic tools.  Highlights include:

 Brun's theorem, which shows that the sum of the reciprocals of the twin primes converges (whereas the sum of the reciprocals of all primes diverges);
 Chen's theorem, which shows that there are infinitely many primes p such that p + 2 is either a prime or a semiprime (the product of two primes); a closely related theorem of Chen Jingrun asserts that every sufficiently large even number is the sum of a prime and another number which is either a prime or a semiprime.  These can be considered to be near-misses to the twin prime conjecture and the Goldbach conjecture respectively.
 The fundamental lemma of sieve theory, which asserts that if one is sifting a set of N numbers, then one can accurately estimate the number of elements left in the sieve after  iterations provided that  is sufficiently small (fractions such as 1/10 are quite typical here). This lemma is usually too weak to sieve out primes (which generally require something like  iterations), but can be enough to obtain results regarding almost primes.
 The Friedlander–Iwaniec theorem, which asserts that there are infinitely many primes of the form .
 Zhang's theorem , which shows that there are infinitely many pairs of primes within a bounded distance. The Maynard–Tao theorem  generalizes Zhang's theorem to arbitrarily long sequences of primes.

Techniques of sieve theory 

The techniques of sieve theory can be quite powerful, but they seem to be limited by an obstacle known as the parity problem, which roughly speaking asserts that sieve theory methods have extreme difficulty distinguishing between numbers with an odd number of prime factors and numbers with an even number of prime factors. This parity problem is still not very well understood.

Compared with other methods in number theory, sieve theory is comparatively elementary, in the sense that it does not necessarily require sophisticated concepts from either algebraic number theory or analytic number theory.

The sieve methods discussed in this article are not closely related to the integer factorization sieve methods such as the quadratic sieve and the general number field sieve. Those factorization methods use the idea of the sieve of Eratosthenes to determine efficiently which members of a list of numbers can be completely factored into small primes.

Literature

External links

References